Acroplectis is a genus of moths belonging to the subfamily Tortricinae of the family Tortricidae.

Species
Acroplectis haemanthes Meyrick, 1927

See also
List of Tortricidae genera

References

 , 2005: World catalogue of insects volume 5 Tortricidae.
 , 1927: Exotic Microlepidoptera. Exotic Microlepidoptera 3(12): 353–384.

External links

tortricidae.com

Euliini
Monotypic moth genera
Tortricidae genera
Taxa named by Edward Meyrick